Mamadou Samassa (born 1 May 1986) is a footballer who plays as a forward and is currently a free agent. He primarily plays in the lead striker role. Born in France, he is a former French under-21 international, but switched allegiance to Mali, his country of origin.

Career

Early career
Born in Montfermeil, Seine-Saint-Denis, Samassa began his career as a youth with local amateur outfit Red Star Paris. After spending over seven years in the club's youth system, he joined Le Mans Union Club 72 in the next region over initially as an under-18 player. While in the club's academy, he helped the Le Mans youth side win the 2004 edition of the Coupe Gambardella. Following the 2005–06 season, he signed his first professional contract and was promoted the senior team being assigned the number 19 shirt.

Le Mans
Samassa made his league debut on the opening match day of the 2006–07 season against Nice starting in a 1–0 victory. In the just the third match of the season, he scored his first career goal as a professional nailing the equaliser in the 53rd minute against Valenciennes. Le Mans later won the match 3–2 with a late goal from another youngster Ismaël Bangoura. Samassa appeared as a starter regularly throughout the season, despite being only 20 years of age. He scored two goals in two matches against Sochaux and also scored against Sedan giving him a total tally of 5 goals for the season. Le Mans won all five matches he scored in.

The next season was projected to be a breakout year for the player, however, in just the fourth match of the season, Samassa was severely injured. He miss four and a half months and returned to the squad on 19 January 2008 in a 1–2 defeat to Bordeaux appearing as a substitute. He made only 16 appearances that season scoring only one goal.

Marseille
On 25 August 2008, Le Mans president Henri Legarda announced that the club had reached an agreement with Olympique de Marseille for the transfer of Samassa with Legarda stating the southern club had made a "suitable offer". Marseille, who viewed the player as a perfect replacement for Djibril Cissé, signed the player to a five-year deal. Mamadou made his debut for the club on 30 August 2008 in a league match against Sochaux appearing as a substitute in a 2–1 victory. It took him almost four months to score his first goal for the club, which he accomplished against Lille on 30 November in a 2–2 draw. Due to not living up to expectation by some, he was criticized by the local media and supporters alike for his low strike rate, appearing in a total of 32 matches, but scoring only 2 goals.

Valenciennes
On 4 August 2009, Marseille announced that Samassa would be loaned out to fellow Ligue 1 club Valenciennes for the entire 2009–10 season.

Persipura Jayapura
In May 2019, he joined Persipura Jayapura.

Blue Boys Muhlenbach
In January 2020 it was confirmed, that Samassa had moved to FC Blue Boys Muhlenbach in the Luxembourg National Division.

International career
Despite being born to Malian parents, Samassa chose originally to represent France at international level. He made six appearances for the under-21 team scoring 3 goals. On 6 January 2009, he revealed that he will represent Mali at the senior level. He stating he made the decision after traveling to Bamako to meet with national team coach Stephen Keshi. He also stated that the encouragement from fellow Malian Mohammed Sissoko also influenced his decision.

Samassa waited until May before earning his first call up for joint World Cup-Africa Cup of Nations qualifiers against Ghana and Benin that was played on 7 and 21 June. Samassa appeared in neither match and also did not make the substitutes' bench for either.

Samassa made his debut for Mali in a 2010 World Cup qualifier against Benin, where he scored his side's only goal in a 1–1 draw. He scored twice during the 2013 African Cup of Nations, with his first goal coming against DR Congo in a crucial 1-1 draw during the group stage. He then opened the scoreline in the 3-1 third place play-off win against Ghana, which brought Mali bronze medals from the tournament.

International goals
Scores and results list Mali's goal tally first, score column indicates score after each Samassa goal.

Honours

Club
Marseille
Trophée des Champions: 2010

International
Mali
Africa Cup of Nations: Bronze medal (2013)

References

External links

1986 births
Living people
French footballers
Malian footballers
People from Montfermeil
Footballers from Seine-Saint-Denis
French expatriate footballers
Malian expatriate footballers
Mali international footballers
2010 Africa Cup of Nations players
France under-21 international footballers
French sportspeople of Malian descent
Association football forwards
Le Mans FC players
Olympique de Marseille players
Valenciennes FC players
A.C. ChievoVerona players
Delfino Pescara 1936 players
Stade Brestois 29 players
Madura United F.C. players
Persipura Jayapura players
FC Blue Boys Muhlenbach players
Ligue 1 players
Ligue 2 players
Serie A players
Serie B players
Malaysia Super League players
Liga 1 (Indonesia) players
Luxembourg National Division players
2013 Africa Cup of Nations players
French expatriate sportspeople in Italy
French expatriate sportspeople in Malaysia
French expatriate sportspeople in Indonesia
French expatriate sportspeople in Luxembourg
Malian expatriate sportspeople in Italy
Malian expatriate sportspeople in Malaysia
Malian expatriate sportspeople in Indonesia
Malian expatriate sportspeople in Luxembourg
Expatriate footballers in Italy
Expatriate footballers in Malaysia
Expatriate footballers in Indonesia
Expatriate footballers in Luxembourg